Zion and His Brother is a 2009 French-Israeli drama film starring Reuven Badalov and Ronit Elkabetz. The film, directed by Eran Merav premiered on 17 January 2009 at the Sundance Film Festival.

Plot synopsis
Amidst the circumstances of an absent father and a single mother busy making ends meet and satisfying her boyfriend, the oldest son Meir takes care of his younger brother, Zion and they evident have an inseparable powerful bond. Meirs is there to handle the situation when Zion confesses that a schoolmate has stolen his soccer sneakers. Yet things unravel when the thief seeks a reprisal, and soon Zion understands he's complicit in a secret only he and Meir share. This pressure and Meir's clashes with their mother's boyfriend leave the fraternal allegiance in disarray.

Cast
Reuven Badalov as Zion
Ronit Elkabetz as Mother
Tzahi Grad as Eli
Zidane Awad as the cousin
Ofer Hayun as Meir

Awards and nominations
Ghent International Film Festival
Best Screenplay - Eran Merav (won)
Best Film - Eran Merav (nomination)

Sundance Film Festival
World cinema - dramatic - Eran Merav (nomination)

References

External links

2009 films
2000s coming-of-age drama films
Films shot in Israel
French coming-of-age drama films
2000s Hebrew-language films
Israeli coming-of-age drama films
2009 drama films
2000s French films